The women's 200 metres event at the 2001 Summer Universiade was held at the Workers Stadium in Beijing, China on 30–31 August.

Medalists

Results

Heats
Wind:Heat 1: ? m/s, Heat 2: +2.2 m/s, Heat 3: +1.1 m/s, Heat 4: +1.5 m/s, Heat 5: ? m/s

Quarterfinals
Wind:Heat 1: 0.0 m/s, Heat 2: -0.4 m/s, Heat 3: +0.9 m/s

Semifinals
Wind:Heat 1: +2.0 m/s, Heat 2: +0.7 m/s

Final
Wind: +0.5

References

Athletics at the 2001 Summer Universiade
2001 in women's athletics
2001